The day before Niger's independence on August 3, 1960, the first American Chargé d'Affaires ad interim, Donald R. Norland, presented his credentials to take effect the following day.  The first United States ambassador to Niger, R. Borden Reams was appointed on October 14, 1960 and presented his credentials on November 23.

Ambassadors

Note: Donald R. Norland (resident in Abidjan) presented credentials as Chargé d'Affaires ad interim, August 2, 1960, to take effect from August 3, 1960. During Reams' tenure as non-resident Ambassador, the Embassy in Niamey was established February 3, 1961, with Joseph W. Schutz as Chargé d'Affaires ad interim.

Notes

See also
Niger – United States relations
Foreign relations of Niger
Ambassadors of the United States

References
United States Department of State: Background notes on Niger

External links
 

Niger
 
Niger diplomacy-related lists